Cancer Letters is a peer-reviewed medical journal established in 1975 that focuses on the rapid publication of original research on multidisciplinary aspects of cancer. The editor-in-chief is M. Schwab.

Abstracting and indexing
Cancer Letters is abstracted and indexed in BIOSIS, Chemical Abstracts, Current Contents/Life Sciences, EMBASE, MEDLINE, Oncology Information Service, PASCAL and FRANCIS, and Scopus.

External links 
 

Oncology journals
Publications established in 1975
Elsevier academic journals
English-language journals
Biweekly journals